Alicio Ignacio Solalinde Miers (born February 1, 1952) is a Paraguayan former footballer who played as a forward and works as a coach.

Career
Born in Villeta, Solalinde began playing football for local side Olimpia de Villeta. He also played for Club Libertad and Club River Plate, but enjoyed his greatest success with Club Olimpia where he became a key player by winning several national and international titles such as the Copa Libertadores and Intercontinental Cup in 1979. Solalinde also played for the Paraguay national football team from 1975 to 1981, where he obtained 32 caps and 4 goals. His most important achievement while playing for Paraguay is winning the 1979 Copa América.

After retiring from professional football, Solalinde became a coach and has managed a large number of Paraguayan teams such as Olimpia, Club 12 de Octubre, Club 2 de Mayo, Club Atletico 3 de Febrero and Sportivo Luqueño. He managed Paraguayan Primera División side Independiente F.B.C. in 2012.

References

1952 births
Living people
Paraguayan footballers
Association football fullbacks
Paraguay international footballers
Paraguayan football managers
Paraguay national football team managers
1975 Copa América players
1979 Copa América players
1993 Copa América managers
Club Olimpia footballers
Club Libertad footballers
Copa América-winning players
Club Olimpia managers
Deportes Puerto Montt managers
Expatriate football managers in Chile
12 de Octubre Football Club managers
Club Sol de América managers
Sportivo Luqueño managers
Deportivo Santaní managers
Independiente F.B.C. managers